Rural is an unincorporated community in Washington Township, Randolph County, in the U.S. state of Indiana.

History
Rural was originally called Wood Station, and under the latter name was founded in about 1870 when the railroad was extended to that point. A post office was established under the name Rural in 1874, and it remained in operation until 1907.

Geography

References

Unincorporated communities in Randolph County, Indiana
Unincorporated communities in Indiana